Zoran Riznić (born 10 April 1968) is a retired Serbian football midfielder.

References

1968 births
Living people
Serbian footballers
FK Mačva Šabac players
FK Rad players
Red Star Belgrade footballers
OFI Crete F.C. players
Athlitiki Enosi Larissa F.C. players
Association football midfielders
Super League Greece players
Serbian expatriate footballers
Expatriate footballers in Greece
Serbian expatriate sportspeople in Greece